The 1829 Pennsylvania gubernatorial election occurred on October 13, 1829. U.S. Representative George Wolf, a Democrat, defeated Anti-Masonic candidate Joseph Ritner to win the election.

Results

References

1829
Pennsylvania
Gubernatorial
November 1829 events